Gerald "Gerry" O'Malley (1928 – 5 January 2016) was an Irish Gaelic footballer who played as a centre-back for the Roscommon senior football team.

Born in Brideswell, County Roscommon, O'Malley was introduced to Gaelic games during his schooling at Brideswell National School and the Marist College. At club level he first lined out as a minor dual player with Four Roads. In a distinguished career spanning over twenty years, O'Malley won seven championship medals as a hurler. As a Gaelic footballer he later moved to the St. Patrick's club before winning four championship medals with St. Brigid's.

O'Malley made his debut on the inter-county scene when he first linked up with the Roscommon junior teams as a dual player. An All-Ireland medallist with the hurling team at the end of his career, O'Malley made his senior football debut during the 1947-48 league. He went on to play a key role for Roscommon during a hugely successful era, and won four Munster medals. He was an All-Ireland runner-up on one occasion.

As a member of the Connacht inter-provincial teams in both codes, he won three Railway Cup medals as a footballer. O'Malley retired from inter-county football following the conclusion of the 1964 championship.

Immediately after his retirement from club activity, O'Malley took charge of the St. Brigid's senior team, guiding them to the championship title in 1969. He later went on to train the Roscommon county footballers that were based in Dublin between 1970 and 1971. The following year O'Malley trained St. Maur's to junior and intermediate championship successes.

References

1928 births
2016 deaths
Four Roads hurlers
Roscommon inter-county Gaelic footballers
Roscommon inter-county hurlers
Connacht inter-provincial Gaelic footballers
Connacht inter-provincial hurlers